The British Raj (from Hindi rāj: kingdom, realm, state, or empire) was the rule of the British Crown on the Indian subcontinent; it is also called Crown rule in India,
or Direct rule in India, and lasted from 1858 to 1947. The region under British control was commonly called India in contemporaneous usage and included areas directly administered by the United Kingdom, which were collectively called British India, and areas ruled by indigenous rulers, but under British paramountcy, called the princely states. The region was sometimes called the Indian Empire, though not officially.

As India, it was a founding member of the League of Nations, a participating nation in the Summer Olympics in 1900, 1920, 1928, 1932, and 1936, and a founding member of the United Nations in San Francisco in 1945.

This system of governance was instituted on 28 June 1858, when, after the Indian Rebellion of 1857, the company rule in India of the British East India Company was transferred to the Crown in the person of Queen Victoria (who, in 1876, was proclaimed Empress of India). It lasted until 1947, when the British Raj was partitioned into two sovereign dominion states: Union of India (later the Republic of India) and Pakistan (later the Islamic Republic of Pakistan and the People's Republic of Bangladesh). At the inception of the Raj in 1858, Lower Burma was already a part of British India; Upper Burma was added in 1886, and the resulting union, Burma, was administered as an autonomous province until 1937, when it became a separate British colony, gaining its own independence in 1948. It was renamed Myanmar in 1989.

Geographical extent

The British Raj extended over almost all present-day India, Pakistan, and Bangladesh, except for small holdings by other European nations such as Goa and Pondicherry. This area is very diverse, containing the Himalayan mountains, fertile floodplains, the Indo-Gangetic Plain, a long coastline, tropical dry forests, arid uplands, and the Thar Desert. In addition, at various times, it included Aden (from 1858 to 1937), Lower Burma (from 1858 to 1937), Upper Burma (from 1886 to 1937), British Somaliland (briefly from 1884 to 1898), and Singapore (briefly from 1858 to 1867). Burma was separated from India and directly administered by the British Crown from 1937 until its independence in 1948. The Trucial States of the Persian Gulf and the states under the Persian Gulf Residency were theoretically princely states as well as presidencies and provinces of British India until 1947 and used the rupee as their unit of currency.

Among other countries in the region, Ceylon, which was referred to coastal regions and northern part of the island at that time (now Sri Lanka) was ceded to Britain in 1802 under the Treaty of Amiens. These coastal regions were temporarily administered under Madras Presidency between 1793 and 1798, but for later periods the British governors reported to London, and it was not part of the Raj. The kingdoms of Nepal and Bhutan, having fought wars with the British, subsequently signed treaties with them and were recognised by the British as independent states. The Kingdom of Sikkim was established as a princely state after the Anglo-Sikkimese Treaty of 1861; however, the issue of sovereignty was left undefined. The Maldive Islands were a British protectorate from 1887 to 1965, but not part of British India.

History

1858–1868: Rebellion aftermath, critiques, and responses

Although the Indian Rebellion of 1857 had shaken the British enterprise in India, it had not derailed it.  Until 1857, the British, especially under Lord Dalhousie, had been hurriedly building an India which they envisaged to be on par with Britain itself in the quality and strength of its economic and social institutions.  After the rebellion, they became more circumspect.  Much thought was devoted to the causes of the rebellion and three main lessons were drawn. First, at a practical level, it was felt that there needed to be more communication and camaraderie between the British and Indians—not just between British army officers and their Indian staff but in civilian life as well. The Indian army was completely reorganised: units composed of the Muslims and Brahmins of the United Provinces of Agra and Oudh, who had formed the core of the rebellion, were disbanded. New regiments, like the Sikhs and Baluchis, composed of Indians who, in British estimation, had demonstrated steadfastness, were formed. From then on, the Indian army was to remain unchanged in its organisation until 1947. The 1861 Census had revealed that the English population in India was 125,945. Of these only about 41,862 were civilians as compared with about 84,083 European officers and men of the Army. In 1880, the standing Indian Army consisted of 66,000 British soldiers, 130,000 Natives, and 350,000 soldiers in the princely armies.

Second, it was also felt that both the princes and the large land-holders, by not joining the rebellion, had proved to be, in Lord Canning's words, "breakwaters in a storm". They too were rewarded in the new British Raj by being integrated into the British-Indian political system and having their territories guaranteed. At the same time, it was felt that the peasants, for whose benefit the large land reforms of the United Provinces had been undertaken, had shown disloyalty, by, in many cases, fighting for their former landlords against the British. Consequently, no more land reforms were implemented for the next 90 years: Bengal and Bihar were to remain the realms of large land holdings (unlike the Punjab and Uttar Pradesh).

Third, the British felt disenchanted with Indian reaction to social change. Until the rebellion, they had enthusiastically pushed through social reform, like the ban on sati by Lord William Bentinck. It was now felt that traditions and customs in India were too strong and too rigid to be changed easily; consequently, no more British social interventions were made, especially in matters dealing with religion, even when the British felt very strongly about the issue (as in the instance of the remarriage of Hindu child widows). This was exemplified further in Queen Victoria's Proclamation released immediately after the rebellion. The proclamation stated that 'We disclaim alike our Right and Desire to impose Our Convictions on any of Our Subjects'; demonstrating official British commitment to abstaining from social intervention in India.

1858–1880: Railways, canals, Famine Code 

In the second half of the 19th century, both the direct administration of India by the British crown and the technological change ushered in by the industrial revolution, had the effect of closely intertwining the economies of India and Great Britain. In fact many of the major changes in transport and communications (that are typically associated with Crown Rule of India) had already begun before the Mutiny. Since Dalhousie had embraced the technological change then rampant in Great Britain, India too saw the rapid development of all those technologies. Railways, roads, canals, and bridges were rapidly built in India, and telegraph links were equally rapidly established in order that raw materials, such as cotton, from India's hinterland, could be transported more efficiently to ports, such as Bombay, for subsequent export to England. Likewise, finished goods from England, were transported back for sale in the burgeoning Indian markets. Unlike Britain, where the market risks for the infrastructure development were borne by private investors, in India, it was the taxpayers—primarily farmers and farm-labourers—who endured the risks, which, in the end, amounted to £50 million. Despite these costs, very little skilled employment was created for Indians. By 1920, with the fourth largest railway network in the world and a history of 60 years of its construction, only ten percent of the "superior posts" in the Indian Railways were held by Indians. 
 
The rush of technology was also changing the agricultural economy in India: by the last decade of the 19th century, a large fraction of some raw materials—not only cotton, but also some food-grains—were being exported to faraway markets. Many small farmers, dependent on the whims of those markets, lost land, animals, and equipment to money-lenders. The latter half of the 19th century also saw an increase in the number of large-scale famines in India. Although famines were not new to the subcontinent, these were particularly severe, with tens of millions dying, and with many critics, both British and Indian, laying the blame at the doorsteps of the lumbering colonial administrations. There were also salutary effects: commercial cropping, especially in the newly canalled Punjab, led to increased food production for internal consumption. The railway network provided critical famine relief, notably reduced the cost of moving goods, and helped nascent Indian-owned industry. After, the Great Famine of 1876–1878, The Indian Famine Commission report was issued in 1880, and the Indian Famine Codes, the earliest famine scales and programmes for famine prevention, were instituted. In one form or other, they would be implemented worldwide by the United Nations and the Food and Agricultural Organisation well into the 1970s.

1880s–1890s: Middle class, Indian National Congress

By 1880, a new middle class had arisen in India and spread thinly across the country. Moreover, there was a growing solidarity among its members, created by the "joint stimuli of encouragement and irritation". The encouragement felt by this class came from its success in education and its ability to avail itself of the benefits of that education such as employment in the Indian Civil Service. It came too from Queen Victoria's proclamation of 1858 in which she had declared, "We hold ourselves bound to the natives of our Indian territories by the same obligation of duty which bind us to all our other subjects." Indians were especially encouraged when Canada was granted dominion status in 1867 and established an autonomous democratic constitution. Lastly, the encouragement came from the work of contemporaneous Oriental scholars like Monier Monier-Williams and Max Müller, who in their works had been presenting ancient India as a great civilisation. Irritation, on the other hand, came not just from incidents of racial discrimination at the hands of the British in India, but also from governmental actions like the use of Indian troops in imperial campaigns (e.g. in the Second Anglo-Afghan War) and the attempts to control the vernacular press (e.g. in the Vernacular Press Act of 1878).

It was, however, Viceroy Lord Ripon's partial reversal of the Ilbert Bill (1883), a legislative measure that had proposed putting Indian judges in the Bengal Presidency on equal footing with British ones, that transformed the discontent into political action. On 28 December 1885, professionals and intellectuals from this middle-class—many educated at the new British-founded universities in Bombay, Calcutta, and Madras, and familiar with the ideas of British political philosophers, especially the utilitarians assembled in Bombay. The seventy men founded the Indian National Congress; Womesh Chunder Bonerjee was elected the first president. The membership comprised a westernised elite and no effort was made at this time to broaden the base.

During its first twenty years, the Congress primarily debated British policy toward India; however, its debates created a new Indian outlook that held Great Britain responsible for draining India of its wealth. Britain did this, the nationalists claimed, by unfair trade, by the restraint on indigenous Indian industry, and by the use of Indian taxes to pay the high salaries of the British civil servants in India.

Thomas Baring served as Viceroy of India 1872–1876. Baring's major accomplishments came as an energetic reformer who was dedicated to upgrading the quality of government in the British Raj. He began large scale famine relief, reduced taxes, and overcame bureaucratic obstacles in an effort to reduce both starvation and widespread social unrest. Although appointed by a Liberal government, his policies were much the same as viceroys appointed by Conservative governments.

Social reform was in the air by the 1880s. For example, Pandita Ramabai, poet, Sanskrit scholar, and a champion of the emancipation of Indian women, took up the cause of widow remarriage, especially of Brahmin widows, later converted to Christianity. By 1900 reform movements had taken root within the Indian National Congress. Congress member Gopal Krishna Gokhale founded the Servants of India Society, which lobbied for legislative reform (for example, for a law to permit the remarriage of Hindu child widows), and whose members took vows of poverty, and worked among the untouchable community.

By 1905, a deep gulf opened between the moderates, led by Gokhale, who downplayed public agitation, and the new "extremists" who not only advocated agitation, but also regarded the pursuit of social reform as a distraction from nationalism. Prominent among the extremists was Bal Gangadhar Tilak, who attempted to mobilise Indians by appealing to an explicitly Hindu political identity, displayed, for example, in the annual public Ganapati festivals that he inaugurated in western India.

1905–1911:Partition of Bengal, Swadeshi, violence

The viceroy, Lord Curzon (1899–1905), was unusually energetic in pursuit of efficiency and reform. His agenda included the creation of the North-West Frontier Province; small changes in the civil services; speeding up the operations of the secretariat; setting up a gold standard to ensure a stable currency; creation of a Railway Board; irrigation reform; reduction of peasant debts; lowering the cost of telegrams; archaeological research and the preservation of antiquities; improvements in the universities; police reforms; upgrading the roles of the Native States; a new Commerce and Industry Department; promotion of industry; revised land revenue policies; lowering taxes; setting up agricultural banks; creating an Agricultural Department; sponsoring agricultural research; establishing an Imperial Library; creating an Imperial Cadet Corps; new famine codes; and, indeed, reducing the smoke nuisance in Calcutta.

Trouble emerged for Curzon when he divided the largest administrative subdivision in British India, the Bengal Province, into the Muslim-majority province of Eastern Bengal and Assam and the Hindu-majority province of West Bengal (present-day Indian states of West Bengal, Bihar, and Odisha). Curzon's act, the Partition of Bengal, had been contemplated by various colonial administrations since the time of Lord William Bentinck, but was never acted upon. Though some considered it administratively felicitous, it was communally charged. It sowed the seeds of division among Indians in Bengal, transforming nationalist politics as nothing else before it. The Hindu elite of Bengal, among them many who owned land in East Bengal that was leased out to Muslim peasants, protested fervidly.

Following the Partition of Bengal, which was a strategy set out by Lord Curzon to weaken the nationalist movement, Tilak encouraged the Swadeshi movement and the Boycott movement. The movement consisted of the boycott of foreign goods and also the social boycott of any Indian who used foreign goods. The Swadeshi movement consisted of the usage of natively produced goods. Once foreign goods were boycotted, there was a gap which had to be filled by the production of those goods in India itself. Bal Gangadhar Tilak said that the Swadeshi and Boycott movements are two sides of the same coin. The large Bengali Hindu middle-class (the Bhadralok), upset at the prospect of Bengalis being outnumbered in the new Bengal province by Biharis and Oriyas, felt that Curzon's act was punishment for their political assertiveness. The pervasive protests against Curzon's decision took the form predominantly of the Swadeshi ("buy Indian") campaign led by two-time Congress president, Surendranath Banerjee, and involved boycott of British goods.

The rallying cry for both types of protest was the slogan Bande Mataram ("Hail to the Mother"), which invoked a mother goddess, who stood variously for Bengal, India, and the Hindu goddess Kali. Sri Aurobindo never went beyond the law when he edited the Bande Mataram magazine; it preached independence but within the bounds of peace as far as possible. Its goal was Passive Resistance. The unrest spread from Calcutta to the surrounding regions of Bengal when students returned home to their villages and towns. Some joined local political youth clubs emerging in Bengal at the time, some engaged in robberies to fund arms, and even attempted to take the lives of Raj officials. However, the conspiracies generally failed in the face of intense police work. The Swadeshi boycott movement cut imports of British textiles by 25%. The swadeshi cloth, although more expensive and somewhat less comfortable than its Lancashire competitor, was worn as a mark of national pride by people all over India.

1870s–1906: Muslim social movements, Muslim League

The overwhelming, but predominantly Hindu, protest against the partition of Bengal and the fear in its wake of reforms favouring the Hindu majority, led the Muslim elite in India to meet with the new viceroy, Lord Minto 
in 1906 and to ask for separate electorates for Muslims. In conjunction, they demanded proportional legislative representation reflecting both their status as former rulers and their record of cooperating with the British. This led, in December 1906, to the founding of the All-India Muslim League in Dacca. Although Curzon, by now, had resigned his position over a dispute with his military chief Lord Kitchener and returned to England, the League was in favour of his partition plan. The Muslim elite's position, which was reflected in the League's position, had crystallized gradually over the previous three decades, beginning with the revelations of the Census of British India in 1871, which had for the first time estimated the populations in regions of the Muslim majority. (For his part, Curzon's desire to court the Muslims of East Bengal had arisen from British anxieties ever since the 1871 census—and in light of the history of Muslims fighting them in the 1857 Mutiny and the Second Anglo-Afghan War—about Indian Muslims rebelling against the Crown.) In the three decades since, Muslim leaders across northern India, had intermittently experienced public animosity from some of the new Hindu political and social groups. The Arya Samaj, for example, had not only supported Cow Protection Societies in their agitation, but also—distraught at the 1871 Census's Muslim numbers—organized "reconversion" events for the purpose of welcoming Muslims back to the Hindu fold. In 1905, when Tilak and Lajpat Rai attempted to rise to leadership positions in the Congress, and the Congress itself rallied around the symbolism of Kali, Muslim fears increased. It was not lost on many Muslims, for example, that the rallying cry, "Bande Mataram," had first appeared in the novel Anand Math in which Hindus had battled their Muslim oppressors. Lastly, the Muslim elite, and among it Dacca Nawab, Khwaja Salimullah, who hosted the League's first meeting in his mansion in Shahbag, was aware that a new province with a Muslim majority would directly benefit Muslims aspiring to political power.

The first steps were taken toward self-government in British India in the late 19th century with the appointment of Indian counsellors to advise the British viceroy and the establishment of provincial councils with Indian members; the British subsequently widened participation in legislative councils with the Indian Councils Act of 1892. Municipal Corporations and District Boards were created for local administration; they included elected Indian members.

The Indian Councils Act 1909, known as the Morley-Minto Reforms (John Morley was the secretary of state for India, and Minto was viceroy)—gave Indians limited roles in the central and provincial legislatures. Upper-class Indians, rich landowners and businessmen were favoured. The Muslim community was made a separate electorate and granted double representation. The goals were quite conservative but they did advance the elective principle.

The partition of Bengal was rescinded in 1911 and announced at the Delhi Durbar at which King George V came in person and was crowned Emperor of India. He announced the capital would be moved from Calcutta to Delhi. This period saw an increase in the activities of revolutionary groups, which included Bengal's Anushilan Samiti and the Punjab's Ghadar Party. However, the British authorities were able to crush violent rebels swiftly, partly because the mainstream of educated Indian politicians opposed violent revolution.

1914–1918: First World War, Lucknow Pact, Home Rule leagues

The First World War would prove to be a watershed in the imperial relationship between Britain and India. Shortly before the outbreak of war, the Government of India had indicated that they could furnish two divisions plus a cavalry brigade, with a further division in case of emergency. Some 1.4million Indian and British soldiers of the British Indian Army took part in the war, primarily in Iraq and the Middle East. Their participation had a wider cultural fallout as news spread of how bravely soldiers fought and died alongside British soldiers, as well as soldiers from dominions like Canada and Australia. India's international profile rose during the 1920s, as it became a founding member of the League of Nations in 1920 and participated, under the name "Les Indes Anglaises" (British India), in the 1920 Summer Olympics in Antwerp. Back in India, especially among the leaders of the Indian National Congress, the war led to calls for greater self-government for Indians.

At the onset of World War I, the reassignment of most of the British army in India to Europe and Mesopotamia, had led the previous viceroy, Lord Harding, to worry about the "risks involved in denuding India of troops". Revolutionary violence had already been a concern in British India; consequently, in 1915, to strengthen its powers during what it saw was a time of increased vulnerability, the Government of India passed the Defence of India Act 1915, which allowed it to intern politically dangerous dissidents without due process, and added to the power it already had—under the 1910 Press Act—both to imprison journalists without trial and to censor the press. It was under the Defence of India act that the Ali brothers were imprisoned in 1916, and Annie Besant, a European woman, and ordinarily more problematic to imprison, was arrested in 1917. Now, as constitutional reform began to be discussed in earnest, the British began to consider how new moderate Indians could be brought into the fold of constitutional politics and, simultaneously, how the hand of established constitutionalists could be strengthened. However, since the Government of India wanted to ensure against any sabotage of the reform process by extremists, and since its reform plan was devised during a time when extremist violence had ebbed as a result of increased governmental control, it also began to consider how some of its wartime powers could be extended into peacetime.

After the 1906 split between the moderates and the extremists in the Indian National Congress, organised political activity by the Congress had remained fragmented until 1914, when Bal Gangadhar Tilak was released from prison and began to sound out other Congress leaders about possible reunification. That, however, had to wait until the demise of Tilak's principal moderate opponents, Gopal Krishna Gokhale and Pherozeshah Mehta, in 1915, whereupon an agreement was reached for Tilak's ousted group to re-enter the Congress. In the 1916 Lucknow session of the Congress, Tilak's supporters were able to push through a more radical resolution which asked for the British to declare that it was their "aim and intention ... to confer self-government on India at an early date". Soon, other such rumblings began to appear in public pronouncements: in 1917, in the Imperial Legislative Council, Madan Mohan Malaviya spoke of the expectations the war had generated in India, "I venture to say that the war has put the clock ... fifty years forward ... (The) reforms after the war will have to be such, ... as will satisfy the aspirations of her (India's) people to take their legitimate part in the administration of their own country."

The 1916 Lucknow Session of the Congress was also the venue of an unanticipated mutual effort by the Congress and the Muslim League, the occasion for which was provided by the wartime partnership between Germany and Turkey. Since the Turkish Sultan, or Khalifah, had also sporadically claimed guardianship of the Islamic holy sites of Mecca, Medina, and Jerusalem, and since the British and their allies were now in conflict with Turkey, doubts began to increase among some Indian Muslims about the "religious neutrality" of the British, doubts that had already surfaced as a result of the reunification of Bengal in 1911, a decision that was seen as ill-disposed to Muslims. In the Lucknow Pact, the League joined the Congress in the proposal for greater self-government that was campaigned for by Tilak and his supporters; in return, the Congress accepted separate electorates for Muslims in the provincial legislatures as well as the Imperial Legislative Council. In 1916, the Muslim League had anywhere between 500 and 800members and did not yet have the wider following among Indian Muslims that it enjoyed in later years; in the League itself, the pact did not have unanimous backing, having largely been negotiated by a group of "Young Party" Muslims from the United Provinces (UP), most prominently, two brothers Mohammad and Shaukat Ali, who had embraced the Pan-Islamic cause; however, it did have the support of a young lawyer from Bombay, Muhammad Ali Jinnah, who was later to rise to leadership roles in both the League and the Indian independence movement. In later years, as the full ramifications of the pact unfolded, it was seen as benefiting the Muslim minority élites of provinces like UP and Bihar more than the Muslim majorities of Punjab and Bengal; nonetheless, at the time, the "Lucknow Pact" was an important milestone in nationalistic agitation and was seen as such by the British.

During 1916, two Home Rule Leagues were founded within the Indian National Congress by Tilak and Annie Besant, respectively, to promote Home Rule among Indians, and also to elevate the stature of the founders within the Congress itself. Besant, for her part, was also keen to demonstrate the superiority of this new form of organised agitation, which had achieved some success in the Irish home rule movement, over the political violence that had intermittently plagued the subcontinent during the years 1907–1914. The two Leagues focused their attention on complementary geographical regions: Tilak's in western India, in the southern Bombay presidency, and Besant's in the rest of the country, but especially in the Madras Presidency and in regions like Sind and Gujarat that had hitherto been considered politically dormant by the Congress. Both leagues rapidly acquired new members—approximately thirtythousand each in a little over a year—and began to publish inexpensive newspapers. Their propaganda also turned to posters, pamphlets, and political-religious songs, and later to mass meetings, which not only attracted greater numbers than in earlier Congress sessions, but also entirely new social groups such as non-Brahmins, traders, farmers, students, and lower-level government workers. Although they did not achieve the magnitude or character of a nationwide mass movement, the Home Rule leagues both deepened and widened organised political agitation for self-rule in India. The British authorities reacted by imposing restrictions on the Leagues, including shutting out students from meetings and banning the two leaders from travelling to certain provinces.

1915–1918: Return of Gandhi

The year 1915 also saw the return of Mohandas Karamchand Gandhi to India. Already known in India as a result of his civil liberties protests on behalf of the Indians in South Africa, Gandhi followed the advice of his mentor Gopal Krishna Gokhale and chose not to make any public pronouncements during the first year of his return, but instead spent the year travelling, observing the country at first hand, and writing. Earlier, during his South Africa sojourn, Gandhi, a lawyer by profession, had represented an Indian community, which, although small, was sufficiently diverse to be a microcosm of India itself. In tackling the challenge of holding this community together and simultaneously confronting the colonial authority, he had created a technique of non-violent resistance, which he labelled Satyagraha (or Striving for Truth). For Gandhi, Satyagraha was different from "passive resistance", by then a familiar technique of social protest, which he regarded as a practical strategy adopted by the weak in the face of superior force; Satyagraha, on the other hand, was for him the "last resort of those strong enough in their commitment to truth to undergo suffering in its cause". Ahimsa or "non-violence", which formed the underpinning of Satyagraha, came to represent the twin pillar, with Truth, of Gandhi's unorthodox religious outlook on life. During the years 1907–1914, Gandhi tested the technique of Satyagraha in a number of protests on behalf of the Indian community in South Africa against the unjust racial laws.

Also, during his time in South Africa, in his essay, Hind Swaraj, (1909), Gandhi formulated his vision of Swaraj, or "self-rule" for India based on three vital ingredients: solidarity between Indians of different faiths, but most of all between Hindus and Muslims; the removal of untouchability from Indian society; and the exercise of swadeshi—the boycott of manufactured foreign goods and the revival of Indian cottage industry. The first two, he felt, were essential for India to be an egalitarian and tolerant society, one befitting the principles of Truth and Ahimsa, while the last, by making Indians more self-reliant, would break the cycle of dependence that was perpetuating not only the direction and tenor of the British rule in India, but also the British commitment to it. At least until 1920, the British presence itself was not a stumbling block in Gandhi's conception of swaraj; rather, it was the inability of Indians to create a modern society.

Gandhi made his political debut in India in 1917 in Champaran district in Bihar, near the Nepal border, where he was invited by a group of disgruntled tenant farmers who, for many years, had been forced into planting indigo (for dyes) on a portion of their land and then selling it at below-market prices to the British planters who had leased them the land. Upon his arrival in the district, Gandhi was joined by other agitators, including a young Congress leader, Rajendra Prasad, from Bihar, who would become a loyal supporter of Gandhi and go on to play a prominent role in the Indian independence movement. When Gandhi was ordered to leave by the local British authorities, he refused on moral grounds, setting up his refusal as a form of individual Satyagraha. Soon, under pressure from the Viceroy in Delhi who was anxious to maintain domestic peace during wartime, the provincial government rescinded Gandhi's expulsion order, and later agreed to an official enquiry into the case. Although the British planters eventually gave in, they were not won over to the farmers' cause, and thereby did not produce the optimal outcome of a Satyagraha that Gandhi had hoped for; similarly, the farmers themselves, although pleased at the resolution, responded less than enthusiastically to the concurrent projects of rural empowerment and education that Gandhi had inaugurated in keeping with his ideal of swaraj. The following year Gandhi launched two more Satyagrahas—both in his native Gujarat—one in the rural Kaira district where land-owning farmers were protesting increased land-revenue and the other in the city of Ahmedabad, where workers in an Indian-owned textile mill were distressed about their low wages. The satyagraha in Ahmedabad took the form of Gandhi fasting and supporting the workers in a strike, which eventually led to a settlement. In Kaira, in contrast, although the farmers' cause received publicity from Gandhi's presence, the satyagraha itself, which consisted of the farmers' collective decision to withhold payment, was not immediately successful, as the British authorities refused to back down. The agitation in Kaira gained for Gandhi another lifelong lieutenant in Sardar Vallabhbhai Patel, who had organised the farmers, and who too would go on to play a leadership role in the Indian independence movement.

1916–1919: Montagu–Chelmsford reforms

In 1916, in the face of new strength demonstrated by the nationalists with the signing of the Lucknow Pact and the founding of the Home Rule leagues, and the realisation, after the disaster in the Mesopotamian campaign, that the war would likely last longer, the new viceroy, Lord Chelmsford, cautioned that the Government of India needed to be more responsive to Indian opinion. Towards the end of the year, after discussions with the government in London, he suggested that the British demonstrate their good faith—in light of the Indian war role—through a number of public actions, including awards of titles and honours to princes, granting of commissions in the army to Indians, and removal of the much-reviled cotton excise duty, but, most importantly, an announcement of Britain's future plans for India and an indication of some concrete steps. After more discussion, in August 1917, the new Liberal secretary of state for India, Edwin Montagu, announced the British aim of "increasing association of Indians in every branch of the administration, and the gradual development of self-governing institutions, with a view to the progressive realisation of responsible government in India as an integral part of the British Empire". Although the plan envisioned limited self-government at first only in the provinces—with India emphatically within the British Empire—it represented the first British proposal for any form of representative government in a non-white colony.

Montagu and Chelmsford presented their report in July 1918 after a long fact-finding trip through India the previous winter. After more discussion by the government and parliament in Britain, and another tour by the Franchise and Functions Committee for the purpose of identifying who among the Indian population could vote in future elections, the Government of India Act 1919 (also known as the Montagu–Chelmsford Reforms) was passed in December 1919. The new Act enlarged both the provincial and Imperial legislative councils and repealed the Government of India's recourse to the "official majority" in unfavourable votes. Although departments like defence, foreign affairs, criminal law, communications, and income-tax were retained by the Viceroy and the central government in New Delhi, other departments like public health, education, land-revenue, local self-government were transferred to the provinces. The provinces themselves were now to be administered under a new diarchical system, whereby some areas like education, agriculture, infrastructure development, and local self-government became the preserve of Indian ministers and legislatures, and ultimately the Indian electorates, while others like irrigation, land-revenue, police, prisons, and control of media remained within the purview of the British governor and his executive council. The new Act also made it easier for Indians to be admitted into the civil services and the army officer corps.

A greater number of Indians were now enfranchised, although, for voting at the national level, they constituted only 10% of the total adult male population, many of whom were still illiterate. In the provincial legislatures, the British continued to exercise some control by setting aside seats for special interests they considered cooperative or useful. In particular, rural candidates, generally sympathetic to British rule and less confrontational, were assigned more seats than their urban counterparts. Seats were also reserved for non-Brahmins, landowners, businessmen, and college graduates. The principal of "communal representation", an integral part of the Minto–Morley Reforms, and more recently of the Congress-Muslim League Lucknow Pact, was reaffirmed, with seats being reserved for Muslims, Sikhs, Indian Christians, Anglo-Indians, and domiciled Europeans, in both provincial and Imperial legislative councils. The Montagu–Chelmsford reforms offered Indians the most significant opportunity yet for exercising legislative power, especially at the provincial level; however, that opportunity was also restricted by the still limited number of eligible voters, by the small budgets available to provincial legislatures, and by the presence of rural and special interest seats that were seen as instruments of British control. Its scope was unsatisfactory to the Indian political leadership, famously expressed by Annie Besant as something "unworthy of England to offer and India to accept".

1917–1919: Rowlatt Act

In 1917, as Montagu and Chelmsford were compiling their report, a committee chaired by a British judge, Sidney Rowlatt, was tasked with investigating "revolutionary conspiracies", with the unstated goal of extending the government's wartime powers. The Rowlatt Committee presented its report in July 1918 and identified three regions of conspiratorial insurgency: Bengal, the Bombay presidency, and the Punjab. To combat subversive acts in these regions, the committee recommended that the government use emergency powers akin to its wartime authority, which included the ability to try cases of sedition by a panel of three judges and without juries, exaction of securities from suspects, governmental overseeing of residences of suspects, and the power for provincial governments to arrest and detain suspects in short-term detention facilities and without trial.

With the end of World War I, there was also a change in the economic climate. By the end of 1919, 1.5million Indians had served in the armed services in either combatant or non-combatant roles, and India had provided £146million in revenue for the war. The increased taxes coupled with disruptions in both domestic and international trade had the effect of approximately doubling the index of overall prices in India between 1914 and 1920. Returning war veterans, especially in the Punjab, created a growing unemployment crisis, and post-war inflation led to food riots in Bombay, Madras, and Bengal provinces, a situation that was made only worse by the failure of the 1918–19 monsoon and by profiteering and speculation. The global influenza epidemic and the Bolshevik Revolution of 1917 added to the general jitters; the former among the population already experiencing economic woes, and the latter among government officials, fearing a similar revolution in India.

To combat what it saw as a coming crisis, the government now drafted the Rowlatt committee's recommendations into two Rowlatt Bills. Although the bills were authorised for legislative consideration by Edwin Montagu, they were done so unwillingly, with the accompanying declaration, "I loathe the suggestion at first sight of preserving the Defence of India Act in peacetime to such an extent as Rowlatt and his friends think necessary." In the ensuing discussion and vote in the Imperial Legislative Council, all Indian members voiced opposition to the bills. The Government of India was, nevertheless, able to use of its "official majority" to ensure passage of the bills early in 1919. However, what it passed, in deference to the Indian opposition, was a lesser version of the first bill, which now allowed extrajudicial powers, but for a period of exactly three years and for the prosecution solely of "anarchical and revolutionary movements", dropping entirely the second bill involving modification the Indian Penal Code. Even so, when it was passed, the new Rowlatt Act aroused widespread indignation throughout India, and brought Gandhi to the forefront of the nationalist movement.

1919–1939: Jallianwala, non-cooperation, GOI Act 1935

The Jallianwala Bagh massacre or "Amritsar massacre", took place in the Jallianwala Bagh public garden in the predominantly Sikh northern city of Amritsar. After days of unrest Brigadier-General Reginald E.H. Dyer forbade public meetings and on Sunday 13 April 1919 fifty British Indian Army soldiers commanded by Dyer began shooting at an unarmed gathering of thousands of men, women, and children without warning. Casualty estimates vary widely, with the Government of India reporting 379dead, with 1,100wounded. The Indian National Congress estimated three times the number of dead. Dyer was removed from duty but he became a celebrated hero in Britain among people with connections to the Raj. Historians consider the episode was a decisive step towards the end of British rule in India.

In 1920, after the British government refused to back down, Gandhi began his campaign of non-cooperation, prompting many Indians to return British awards and honours, to resign from the civil services, and to again boycott British goods. In addition, Gandhi reorganised the Congress, transforming it into a mass movement and opening its membership to even the poorest Indians. Although Gandhi halted the non-cooperation movement in 1922 after the violent incident at Chauri Chaura, the movement revived again, in the mid-1920s.

The visit, in 1928, of the British Simon Commission, charged with instituting constitutional reform in India, resulted in widespread protests throughout the country. Earlier, in 1925, non-violent protests of the Congress had resumed too, this time in Gujarat, and led by Patel, who organised farmers to refuse payment of increased land taxes; the success of this protest, the Bardoli Satyagraha, brought Gandhi back into the fold of active politics.

At its annual session in Lahore, the Indian National Congress, under the presidency of Jawaharlal Nehru, issued a demand for Purna Swaraj (Hindustani language: "complete independence"), or Purna Swarajya. The declaration was drafted by the Congress Working Committee, which included Gandhi, Nehru, Patel, and Chakravarthi Rajagopalachari. Gandhi subsequently led an expanded movement of civil disobedience, culminating in 1930 with the Salt Satyagraha, in which thousands of Indians defied the tax on salt, by marching to the sea and making their own salt by evaporating seawater. Although, many, including Gandhi, were arrested, the British government eventually gave in, and in 1931 Gandhi travelled to London to negotiate new reform at the Round Table Conferences.

In local terms, British control rested on the Indian Civil Service (ICS), but it faced growing difficulties. Fewer and fewer young men in Britain were interested in joining, and the continuing distrust of Indians resulted in a declining base in terms of quality and quantity. By 1945 Indians were numerically dominant in the ICS and at issue was divided loyalty between the Empire and independence. The finances of the Raj depended on land taxes, and these became problematic in the 1930s. Epstein argues that after 1919 it became harder and harder to collect the land revenue. The Raj's suppression of civil disobedience after 1934 temporarily increased the power of the revenue agents but after 1937 they were forced by the new Congress-controlled provincial governments to hand back confiscated land. Again the outbreak of war strengthened them, in the face of the Quit India movement the revenue collectors had to rely on military force and by 1946–47 direct British control was rapidly disappearing in much of the countryside.

In 1935, after the Round Table Conferences, Parliament passed the Government of India Act 1935, which authorised the establishment of independent legislative assemblies in all provinces of British India, the creation of a central government incorporating both the British provinces and the princely states, and the protection of Muslim minorities. The future Constitution of independent India was based on this act. However, it divided the electorate into 19 religious and social categories, e.g., Muslims, Sikhs, Indian Christians, Depressed Classes, Landholders, Commerce and Industry, Europeans, Anglo-Indians, etc., each of which was given separate representation in the Provincial Legislative Assemblies. A voter could cast a vote only for candidates in his own category.

The 1935 Act provided for more autonomy for Indian provinces, with the goal of cooling off nationalist sentiment. The act provided for a national parliament and an executive branch under the purview of the British government, but the rulers of the princely states managed to block its implementation. These states remained under the full control of their hereditary rulers, with no popular government. To prepare for elections Congress built up its grass roots membership from 473,000 in 1935 to 4.5million in 1939.

In the 1937 elections Congress won victories in seven of the eleven provinces of British India. Congress governments, with wide powers, were formed in these provinces. The widespread voter support for the Indian National Congress surprised Raj officials, who previously had seen the Congress as a small elitist body. The British separated Burma Province from British India in 1937 and granted the colony a new constitution calling for a fully elected assembly, with many powers given to the Burmese, but this proved to be a divisive issue as a ploy to exclude Burmese from any further Indian reforms.

1939–1945: World War II

With the outbreak of World War II in 1939, the viceroy, Lord Linlithgow, declared war on India's behalf without consulting Indian leaders, leading the Congress provincial ministries to resign in protest. The Muslim League, in contrast, supported Britain in the war effort and maintained its control of the government in three major provinces, Bengal, Sind and the Punjab.

While the Muslim League had been a small elite group in 1927 with only 1300members, it grew rapidly once it became an organisation that reached out to the masses, reaching 500,000members in Bengal in 1944, 200,000 in Punjab, and hundreds of thousands elsewhere. Jinnah now was well positioned to negotiate with the British from a position of power. Jinnah repeatedly warned that Muslims would be unfairly treated in an independent India dominated by the Congress. On 24 March 1940 in Lahore, the League passed the "Lahore Resolution", demanding that, "the areas in which the Muslims are numerically in majority as in the North-Western and Eastern zones of India should be grouped to constitute independent states in which the constituent units shall be autonomous and sovereign." Although there were other important national Muslim politicians such as Congress leader Ab'ul Kalam Azad, and influential regional Muslim politicians such as A. K. Fazlul Huq of the leftist Krishak Praja Party in Bengal, Fazl-i-Hussain of the landlord-dominated Punjab Unionist Party, and Abd al-Ghaffar Khan of the pro-Congress Khudai Khidmatgar (popularly, "red shirts") in the North West Frontier Province, the British, over the next six years, were to increasingly see the League as the main representative of Muslim India.

The Congress was secular and strongly opposed to having any religious state. It insisted there was a natural unity to India, and repeatedly blamed the British for "divide and rule" tactics based on prompting Muslims to think of themselves as alien from Hindus. Jinnah rejected the notion of a united India, and emphasised that religious communities were more basic than an artificial nationalism. He proclaimed the Two-Nation Theory, stating at Lahore on 23 March 1940:

While the regular Indian army in 1939 included about 220,000native troops, it expanded tenfold during the war, and small naval and air force units were created. Over twomillion Indians volunteered for military service in the British Army. They played a major role in numerous campaigns, especially in the Middle East and North Africa. Casualties were moderate (in terms of the world war), with 24,000killed; 64,000 wounded; 12,000missing (probably dead), and 60,000captured at Singapore in 1942.

London paid most of the cost of the Indian Army, which had the effect of erasing India's national debt; it ended the war with a surplus of £1,300million. In addition, heavy British spending on munitions produced in India (such as uniforms, rifles, machine-guns, field artillery, and ammunition) led to a rapid expansion of industrial output, such as textiles (up 16%), steel (up 18%), and chemicals (up 30%). Small warships were built, and an aircraft factory opened in Bangalore. The railway system, with 700,000 employees, was taxed to the limit as demand for transportation soared.

The British government sent the Cripps mission in 1942 to secure Indian nationalists' co-operation in the war effort in exchange for a promise of independence as soon as the war ended. Top officials in Britain, most notably Prime Minister Winston Churchill, did not support the Cripps Mission and negotiations with the Congress soon broke down.

Congress launched the Quit India Movement in July 1942 demanding the immediate withdrawal of the British from India or face nationwide civil disobedience. On 8 August the Raj arrested all national, provincial and local Congress leaders, holding tens of thousands of them until 1945. The country erupted in violent demonstrations led by students and later by peasant political groups, especially in Eastern United Provinces, Bihar, and western Bengal. The large wartime British Army presence crushed the movement in a little more than six weeks; nonetheless, a portion of the movement formed for a time an underground provisional government on the border with Nepal. In other parts of India, the movement was less spontaneous and the protest less intensive, however it lasted sporadically into the summer of 1943.

Earlier, Subhas Chandra Bose, who had been a leader of the younger, radical, wing of the Indian National Congress in the late 1920s and 1930s, had risen to become Congress President from 1938 to 1939. However, he was ousted from the Congress in 1939 following differences with the high command, and subsequently placed under house arrest by the British before escaping from India in early 1941. He turned to Nazi Germany and Imperial Japan for help in gaining India's independence by force. With Japanese support, he organised the Indian National Army, composed largely of Indian soldiers of the British Indian Army who had been captured by the Japanese in the Battle of Singapore. As the war turned against them, the Japanese came to support a number of puppet and provisional governments in the captured regions, including those in Burma, the Philippines and Vietnam, and in addition, the Provisional Government of Azad Hind, presided by Bose.

Bose's effort, however, was short-lived. In mid-1944 the British Army first halted and then reversed the Japanese U-Go offensive, beginning the successful part of the Burma Campaign. Bose's Indian National Army largely disintegrated during the subsequent fighting in Burma, with its remaining elements surrendering with the recapture of Singapore in September 1945. Bose died in August from third degree burns received after attempting to escape in an overloaded Japanese plane which crashed in Taiwan, which many Indians believe did not happen. Although Bose was unsuccessful, he roused patriotic feelings in India.

1946–1947: Independence, Partition

In January 1946, a number of mutinies broke out in the armed services, starting with that of RAF servicemen frustrated with their slow repatriation to Britain. The mutinies came to a head with mutiny of the Royal Indian Navy in Bombay in February 1946, followed by others in Calcutta, Madras, and Karachi. Although the mutinies were rapidly suppressed, they had the effect of spurring the new Labour government in Britain to action, and leading to the Cabinet Mission to India led by the secretary of state for India, Lord Pethick Lawrence, and including Sir Stafford Cripps, who had visited four years before.

Also in early 1946, new elections were called in India. Earlier, at the end of the war in 1945, the colonial government had announced the public trial of three senior officers of Bose's defeated Indian National Army who stood accused of treason. Now as the trials began, the Congress leadership, although ambivalent towards the INA, chose to defend the accused officers. The subsequent convictions of the officers, the public outcry against the convictions, and the eventual remission of the sentences, created positive propaganda for the Congress, which only helped in the party's subsequent electoral victories in eight of the eleven provinces. The negotiations between the Congress and the Muslim League, however, stumbled over the issue of the partition. Jinnah proclaimed 16 August 1946, Direct Action Day, with the stated goal of highlighting, peacefully, the demand for a Muslim homeland in British India. The following day Hindu-Muslim riots broke out in Calcutta and quickly spread throughout British India. Although the Government of India and the Congress were both shaken by the course of events, in September, a Congress-led interim government was installed, with Jawaharlal Nehru as united India's prime minister.

Later that year, the British Exchequer exhausted by the recently concluded World War II, and the Labour government conscious that it had neither the mandate at home, the international support, nor the reliability of native forces for continuing to control an increasingly restless British India, decided to end British rule of India, and in early 1947 Britain announced its intention of transferring power no later than June 1948.

As independence approached, the violence between Hindus and Muslims in the provinces of Punjab and Bengal continued unabated. With the British army unprepared for the potential for increased violence, the new viceroy, Louis Mountbatten, advanced the date for the transfer of power, allowing less than six months for a mutually agreed plan for independence. In June 1947, the nationalist leaders, including Sardar Patel, Nehru and Abul Kalam Azad on behalf of the Congress, Jinnah representing the Muslim League, B. R. Ambedkar representing the Untouchable community, and Master Tara Singh representing the Sikhs, agreed to a partition of the country along religious lines in stark opposition to Gandhi's views. The predominantly Hindu and Sikh areas were assigned to the new nation of India and predominantly Muslim areas to the new nation of Pakistan; the plan included a partition of the Muslim-majority provinces of Punjab and Bengal.

On 15 August 1947, the new Dominion of Pakistan (later Islamic Republic of Pakistan), with Muhammad Ali Jinnah as the governor-general; and the Dominion of India, (later Republic of India) with Jawaharlal Nehru as the prime minister, and the viceroy, Louis Mountbatten, staying on as its first governor-general came into being; with official ceremonies taking place in Karachi on 14 August and New Delhi on 15 August. This was done so that Mountbatten could attend both ceremonies.

The great majority of Indians remained in place with independence, but in border areas millions of people (Muslim, Sikh, and Hindu) relocated across the newly drawn borders. In Punjab, where the new border lines divided the Sikh regions in half, there was much bloodshed; in Bengal and Bihar, where Gandhi's presence assuaged communal tempers, the violence was more limited. In all, somewhere between 250,000 and 500,000 people on both sides of the new borders, among both the refugee and resident populations of the three faiths, died in the violence.

Timeline of major events, legislation, and public works

British India and the princely states

India during the British Raj was made up of two types of territory: British India and the Native States (or Princely States). In its Interpretation Act 1889, the British Parliament adopted the following definitions in Section 18:

In general, the term "British India" had been used (and is still used) to refer also to the regions under the rule of the British East India Company in India from 1600 to 1858. The term has also been used to refer to the "British in India".

The terms "Indian Empire" and "Empire of India" (like the term "British Empire") were not used in legislation. The monarch was officially known as Empress or Emperor of India and the term was often used in Queen Victoria's Queen's Speeches and Prorogation Speeches. In addition, an order of knighthood, the Most Eminent Order of the Indian Empire, was set up in 1878.

Suzerainty over 175 princely states, some of the largest and most important, was exercised (in the name of the British Crown) by the central government of British India under the viceroy; the remaining approximately 500 states were dependents of the provincial governments of British India under a governor, lieutenant-governor, or chief commissioner (as the case might have been). A clear distinction between "dominion" and "suzerainty" was supplied by the jurisdiction of the courts of law: the law of British India rested upon the laws passed by the British Parliament and the legislative powers those laws vested in the various governments of British India, both central and local; in contrast, the courts of the Princely States existed under the authority of the respective rulers of those states.

Major provinces

At the turn of the 20th century, British India consisted of eightprovinces that were administered either by a governor or a lieutenant-governor.

During the partition of Bengal (1905–1913), the new provinces of Assam and East Bengal were created as a Lieutenant-Governorship. In 1911, East Bengal was reunited with Bengal, and the new provinces in the east became: Assam, Bengal, Bihar and Orissa.

Minor provinces
In addition, there were a few minor provinces that were administered by a chief commissioner:

Princely states

A Princely State, also called a Native State or an Indian State, was a British vassal state in India with an indigenous nominal Indian ruler, subject to a subsidiary alliance. There were 565 princely states when India and Pakistan became independent from Britain in August 1947. The princely states did not form a part of British India (i.e. the presidencies and provinces), as they were not directly under British rule. The larger ones had treaties with Britain that specified which rights the princes had; in the smaller ones the princes had few rights. Within the princely states external affairs, defence and most communications were under British control. The British also exercised a general influence over the states' internal politics, in part through the granting or withholding of recognition of individual rulers. Although there were nearly 600 princely states, the great majority were very small and contracted out the business of government to the British. Some two hundred of the states had an area of less than .The last vestige of the Mughal empire in Delhi which was under Company authority prior to the advent of British Raj was finally abolished and seized by the Crown in the aftermath of the Sepoy Mutiny of 1857 for its support to the rebellion.

The princely states were grouped into agencies and residencies.

Organisation

Following the Indian Rebellion of 1857 (usually called the Indian Mutiny by the British), the Government of India Act 1858 made changes in the governance of India at three levels:
 in the imperial government in London,
 in the central government in Calcutta, and
 in the provincial governments in the presidencies (and later in the provinces).

In London, it provided for a cabinet-level Secretary of State for India and a fifteen-member Council of India, whose members were required, as one prerequisite of membership, to have spent at least ten years in India and to have done so no more than ten years before. Although the secretary of state formulated the policy instructions to be communicated to India, he was required in most instances to consult the Council, but especially so in matters relating to spending of Indian revenues. The Act envisaged a system of "double government" in which the Council ideally served both as a check on excesses in imperial policy-making and as a body of up-to-date expertise on India. However, the secretary of state also had special emergency powers that allowed him to make unilateral decisions, and, in reality, the Council's expertise was sometimes outdated. From 1858 until 1947, twenty-seven individuals served as Secretary of State for India and directed the India Office; these included: Sir Charles Wood (1859–1866), the Marquess of Salisbury (1874–1878; later British prime minister), John Morley (1905–1910; initiator of the Minto–Morley Reforms), E. S. Montagu (1917–1922; an architect of the Montagu–Chelmsford Reforms), and Frederick Pethick-Lawrence (1945–1947; head of the 1946 Cabinet Mission to India). The size of the Advisory Council was reduced over the next half-century, but its powers remained unchanged. In 1907, for the first time, two Indians were appointed to the Council. They were K.G. Gupta and Syed Hussain Bilgrami.

In Calcutta, the governor-general remained head of the Government of India and now was more commonly called the viceroy on account of his secondary role as the Crown's representative to the nominally sovereign princely states; he was, however, now responsible to the secretary of state in London and through him to Parliament. A system of "double government" had already been in place during the Company's rule in India from the time of Pitt's India Act of 1784. The governor-general in the capital, Calcutta, and the governor in a subordinate presidency (Madras or Bombay) was each required to consult his advisory council; executive orders in Calcutta, for example, were issued in the name of "Governor-General-in-Council" (i.e. the Governor-General with the advice of the Council). The Company's system of "double government" had its critics, since, from the time of the system's inception, there had been intermittent feuding between the governor-general and his Council; still, the Act of 1858 made no major changes in governance. However, in the years immediately thereafter, which were also the years of post-rebellion reconstruction, Viceroy Lord Canning found the collective decision making of the Council to be too time-consuming for the pressing tasks ahead, so he requested the "portfolio system" of an Executive Council in which the business of each government department (the "portfolio") was assigned to and became the responsibility of a single council member. Routine departmental decisions were made exclusively by the member, but important decisions required the consent of the governor-general and, in the absence of such consent, required discussion by the entire Executive Council. This innovation in Indian governance was promulgated in the Indian Councils Act 1861.

If the Government of India needed to enact new laws, the Councils Act allowed for a Legislative Council—an expansion of the Executive Council by up to twelve additional members, each appointed to a two-year term—with half the members consisting of British officials of the government (termed official) and allowed to vote, and the other half, comprising Indians and domiciled Britons in India (termed non-official) and serving only in an advisory capacity. All laws enacted by Legislative Councils in India, whether by the Imperial Legislative Council in Calcutta or by the provincial ones in Madras and Bombay, required the final assent of the secretary of state in London; this prompted Sir Charles Wood, the second secretary of state, to describe the Government of India as "a despotism controlled from home". Moreover, although the appointment of Indians to the Legislative Council was a response to calls after the 1857 rebellion, most notably by Sayyid Ahmad Khan, for more consultation with Indians, the Indians so appointed were from the landed aristocracy, often chosen for their loyalty, and far from representative. Even so, the "...  tiny advances in the practice of representative government were intended to provide safety valves for the expression of public opinion, which had been so badly misjudged before the rebellion". Indian affairs now also came to be more closely examined in the British Parliament and more widely discussed in the British press.

With the promulgation of the Government of India Act 1935, the Council of India was abolished with effect from 1 April 1937 and a modified system of government enacted. The secretary of state for India represented the Government of India in the UK. He was assisted by a body of advisers numbering from 8–12 individuals, at least half of whom were required to have held office in India for a minimum of 10 years, and had not relinquished office earlier than two years prior to their appointment as advisers to the secretary of state.

The viceroy and governor-general of India, a Crown appointee, typically held office for five years though there was no fixed tenure, and received an annual salary of Rs. 2,50,800  (£18,810 p.a.). He headed the Viceroy's Executive Council, each member of which had responsibility for a department of the central administration. From 1 April 1937, the position of Governor-General in Council, which the viceroy and governor-general concurrently held in the capacity of representing the Crown in relations with the Indian princely states, was replaced by the designation of "HM Representative for the Exercise of the Functions of the Crown in its Relations with the Indian States", or the "Crown Representative". The Executive Council was greatly expanded during the Second World War, and in 1947 comprised 14members (secretaries), each of whom earned a salary of Rs. 66,000 p.a. (£4,950 p.a.). The portfolios in 1946–1947 were:
 External Affairs and Commonwealth Relations
 Home and Information and Broadcasting
 Food and transportation
 Transport and Railways
 Labour
 Industries and Supplies
 Works, Mines and Power
 Education
 Defence
 Finance
 Commerce
 Communications
 Health
 Law
Until 1946, the viceroy held the portfolio for External Affairs and Commonwealth Relations, as well as heading the Political Department in his capacity as the Crown representative. Each department was headed by a secretary excepting the Railway Department, which was headed by a Chief Commissioner of Railways under a secretary.

The viceroy and governor-general was also the head of the bicameral Indian Legislature, consisting of an upper house (the Council of State) and a lower house (the Legislative Assembly). The viceroy was the head of the Council of State, while the Legislative Assembly, which was first opened in 1921, was headed by an elected president (appointed by the Viceroy from 1921 to 1925). The Council of State consisted of 58members (32elected, 26nominated), while the Legislative Assembly comprised 141members (26nominated officials, 13others nominated and 102elected). The Council of State existed in five-year periods and the Legislative Assembly for three-year periods, though either could be dissolved earlier or later by the Viceroy. The Indian Legislature was empowered to make laws for all persons resident in British India including all British subjects resident in India, and for all British Indian subjects residing outside India. With the assent of the King-Emperor and after copies of a proposed enactment had been submitted to both houses of the British Parliament, the Viceroy could overrule the legislature and directly enact any measures in the perceived interests of British India or its residents if the need arose.

Effective from 1 April 1936, the Government of India Act created the new provinces of Sind (separated from the Bombay Presidency) and Orissa (separated from the Province of Bihar and Orissa). Burma and Aden became separate Crown Colonies under the Act from 1 April 1937, thereby ceasing to be part of the Indian Empire. From 1937 onwards, British India was divided into 17 administrations: the three Presidencies of Madras, Bombay and Bengal, and the 14 provinces of the United Provinces, Punjab, Bihar, the Central Provinces and Berar, Assam, the North-West Frontier Province (NWFP), Orissa, Sind, British Baluchistan, Delhi, Ajmer-Merwara, Coorg, the Andaman and Nicobar Islands and Panth Piploda. The Presidencies and the first eight provinces were each under a governor, while the latter six provinces were each under a chief commissioner. The viceroy directly governed the chief commissioner provinces through each respective chief commissioner, while the Presidencies and the provinces under governors were allowed greater autonomy under the Government of India Act. Each Presidency or province headed by a governor had either a provincial bicameral legislature (in the Presidencies, the United Provinces, Bihar and Assam) or a unicameral legislature (in the Punjab, Central Provinces and Berar, NWFP, Orissa and Sind). The governor of each presidency or province represented the Crown in his capacity, and was assisted by a ministers appointed from the members of each provincial legislature. Each provincial legislature had a life of five years, barring any special circumstances such as wartime conditions. All bills passed by the provincial legislature were either signed or rejected by the governor, who could also issue proclamations or promulgate ordinances while the legislature was in recess, as the need arose.

Each province or presidency comprised a number of divisions, each headed by a commissioner and subdivided into districts, which were the basic administrative units and each headed by a district magistrate, collector or deputy commissioner; in 1947, British India comprised 230 districts.

Flags of British raj

Legal system

Singha argues that after 1857 the colonial government strengthened and expanded its infrastructure via the court system, legal procedures, and statutes. New legislation merged the Crown and the old East India Company courts and introduced a new penal code as well as new codes of civil and criminal procedure, based largely on English law. In the 1860s–1880s the Raj set up compulsory registration of births, deaths, and marriages, as well as adoptions, property deeds, and wills. The goal was to create a stable, usable public record and verifiable identities. However, there was opposition from both Muslim and Hindu elements who complained that the new procedures for census-taking and registration threatened to uncover female privacy. Purdah rules prohibited women from saying their husband's name or having their photograph taken. An all-India census was conducted between 1868 and 1871, often using total numbers of females in a household rather than individual names. Select groups which the Raj reformers wanted to monitor statistically included those reputed to practice female infanticide, prostitutes, lepers, and eunuchs.

Murshid argues that women were in some ways more restricted by the modernisation of the laws. They remained tied to the strictures of their religion, caste, and customs, but now with an overlay of British Victorian attitudes. Their inheritance rights to own and manage property were curtailed; the new English laws were somewhat harsher. Court rulings restricted the rights of second wives and their children regarding inheritance. A woman had to belong to either a father or a husband to have any rights.

Economy

Economic trends

All three sectors of the economy—agriculture, manufacturing, and services—accelerated in the postcolonial India. In agriculture a huge increase in production took place in the 1870s. The most important difference between colonial and postcolonial India was the utilisation of land surplus with productivity-led growth by using high-yielding variety seeds, chemical fertilizers and more intensive application of water. All these three inputs were subsidised by the state. The result was, on average, no long-term change in per capita income levels, though cost of living had grown higher. Agriculture was still dominant, with most peasants at the subsistence level. Extensive irrigation systems were built, providing an impetus for switching to cash crops for export and for raw materials for Indian industry, especially jute, cotton, sugarcane, coffee and tea. India's global share of GDP fell drastically from above 20% to less than 5% in the colonial period. Historians have been bitterly divided on issues of economic history, with the Nationalist school (following Nehru) arguing that India was poorer at the end of British rule than at the beginning and that impoverishment occurred because of the British.

Mike Davis writes that much of the economic activity in British India was for the benefit of the British economy and was carried out relentlessly through repressive British imperial policies and with negative repercussions for the Indian population. This is reified in India's large exports of wheat to Britain: despite a major famine that claimed between 6 and 10million lives in the late 1870s, these exports remained unchecked. A colonial government committed to laissez-faire economics refused to interfere with these exports or provide any relief.

Industry
With the end of the state-granted monopoly of the East India Trading Company in 1813, the importation into India of British manufactured goods, including finished textiles, increased dramatically, from approximately 1 million yards of cotton cloth in 1814 to 13 million in 1820, 995 million in 1870, to 2050 million by 1890. The British imposed "free trade" on India, while continental Europe and the United States erected stiff tariff barriers ranging from 30% to 70% on the importation of cotton yarn or prohibited it entirely. As a result of the less expensive imports from more industrialized Britain, India's most significant industrial sector, textile production, shrank, such that by 1870–1880 Indian producers were manufacturing only 25%–45% of local consumption. Deindustrialization of India's iron industry was even more extensive during this period.

The entrepreneur Jamsetji Tata (1839–1904) began his industrial career in 1877 with the Central India Spinning, Weaving, and Manufacturing Company in Bombay. While other Indian mills produced cheap coarse yarn (and later cloth) using local short-staple cotton and cheap machinery imported from Britain, Tata did much better by importing expensive longer-stapled cotton from Egypt and buying more complex ring-spindle machinery from the United States to spin finer yarn that could compete with imports from Britain.

In the 1890s, he launched plans to move into heavy industry using Indian funding. The Raj did not provide capital, but, aware of Britain's declining position against the US and Germany in the steel industry, it wanted steel mills in India. It promised to purchase any surplus steel Tata could not otherwise sell. The Tata Iron and Steel Company (TISCO), now headed by his son Dorabji Tata (1859–1932), began constructing its plant at Jamshedpur in Bihar in 1908, using American technology, not British. According to The Oxford Dictionary of National Biography, TISCO became the leading iron and steel producer in India, and "a symbol of Indian technical skill, managerial competence, and entrepreneurial flair". The Tata family, like most of India's big businessmen, were Indian nationalists but did not trust the Congress because it seemed too aggressively hostile to the Raj, too socialist, and too supportive of trade unions.

Railways

British India built a modern railway system in the late 19th century, which was the fourth largest in the world. At first the railways were privately owned and operated. They were run by British administrators, engineers and craftsmen. At first, only the unskilled workers were Indians.

The East India Company (and later the colonial government) encouraged new railway companies backed by private investors under a scheme that would provide land and guarantee an annual return of up to 5% during the initial years of operation. The companies were to build and operate the lines under a 99-year lease, with the government having the option to buy them earlier. Two new railway companies, the Great Indian Peninsular Railway (GIPR) and the East Indian Railway Company (EIR) began to construct and operate lines near Bombay and Calcutta in 1853–54. The first passenger railway line in North India, between Allahabad and Kanpur, opened in 1859. Eventually, five British companies came to own all railway business in India, and operated under a profit maximization scheme. Further, there was no government regulation of these companies.

In 1854, Governor-General Lord Dalhousie formulated a plan to construct a network of trunk lines connecting the principal regions of India. Encouraged by the government guarantees, investment flowed in and a series of new rail companies was established, leading to rapid expansion of the rail system in India. Soon several large princely states built their own rail systems and the network spread to the regions that became the modern-day states of Assam, Rajasthan and Andhra Pradesh.

After the Sepoy Rebellion in 1857, and subsequent Crown rule over India, the railways were seen as a strategic defense of the European population, allowing the military to move quickly to subdue native unrest and protect Britons. The railway thus served as a tool of the colonial government to control India as they were "an essential strategic, defensive, subjugators and administrative 'tool'" for the Imperial Project.

Most of the railway construction was done by Indian companies supervised by British engineers. The system was heavily built, using a broad gauge, sturdy tracks and strong bridges. By 1900 India had a full range of rail services with diverse ownership and management, operating on broad, metre and narrow gauge networks. In 1900, the government took over the GIPR network, while the company continued to manage it. During the First World War, the railways were used to transport troops and grain to the ports of Bombay and Karachi en route to Britain, Mesopotamia, and East Africa. With shipments of equipment and parts from Britain curtailed, maintenance became much more difficult; critical workers entered the army; workshops were converted to making munitions; the locomotives, rolling stock, and track of some entire lines were shipped to the Middle East. The railways could barely keep up with the increased demand. By the end of the war, the railways had deteriorated for lack of maintenance and were not profitable. In 1923, both GIPR and EIR were nationalised.

Headrick shows that until the 1930s, both the Raj lines and the private companies hired only European supervisors, civil engineers, and even operating personnel, such as locomotive engineers. The hard physical labor was left to the Indians. The colonial government was chiefly concerned with the welfare of European workers, and any Indian deaths were "either ignored or merely mentioned as a cold statistical figure." The government's Stores Policy required that bids on railway contracts be made to the India Office in London, shutting out most Indian firms. The railway companies purchased most of their hardware and parts in Britain. There were railway maintenance workshops in India, but they were rarely allowed to manufacture or repair locomotives.

The Second World War severely impaired the railways as rolling stock was diverted to the Middle East, and the railway workshops were converted into munitions workshops. After independence in 1947, forty-two separate railway systems, including thirty-two lines owned by the former Indian princely states, were amalgamated to form a single nationalised unit named the Indian Railways.

India provides an example of the British Empire pouring its money and expertise into a very well-built system designed for military purposes (after the Rebellion of 1857), in the hope that it would stimulate industry. The system was overbuilt and too expensive for the small amount of freight traffic it carried. Christensen (1996), who looked at colonial purpose, local needs, capital, service, and private-versus-public interests, concluded that making the railways a creature of the state hindered success because railway expenses had to go through the same time-consuming and political budgeting process as did all other state expenses. Railway costs could therefore not be tailored to the current needs of the railways or of their passengers.

Irrigation

The British Raj invested heavily in infrastructure, including canals and irrigation systems. The Ganges Canal reached  from Haridwar to Cawnpore (now Kanpur), and supplied thousands of kilometres of distribution canals. By 1900 the Raj had the largest irrigation system in the world. One success story was Assam, a jungle in 1840 that by 1900 had  under cultivation, especially in tea plantations. In all, the amount of irrigated land rose eightfold. Historian David Gilmour says:

Policies

In the second half of the 19th century, both the direct administration of India by the British Crown and the technological change ushered in by the industrial revolution had the effect of closely intertwining the economies of India and Great Britain. In fact many of the major changes in transport and communications (that are typically associated with Crown rule of India) had already begun before the Rebellion. Since Dalhousie had embraced the technological revolution underway in Britain, India too saw rapid development of all those technologies. Railways, roads, canals, and bridges were rapidly built in India and telegraph links equally rapidly established in order that raw materials, such as cotton, from India's hinterland could be transported more efficiently to ports, such as Bombay, for subsequent export to England. Likewise, finished goods from England, were transported back, just as efficiently, for sale in the burgeoning Indian markets. Massive railway projects were begun in earnest and government railway jobs and pensions attracted a large number of upper caste Hindus into the civil services for the first time. The Indian Civil Service was prestigious and paid well. It remained politically neutral. Imports of British cotton cloth captured more than half the Indian market in the late 19th and early 20th centuries. Industrial production as it developed in European factories was unknown until the 1850s when the first cotton mills were opened in Bombay, posing a challenge to the cottage-based home production system based on family labour.

Taxes in India decreased during the colonial period for most of India's population; with the land tax revenue claiming 15% of India's national income during Mughal times compared with 1% at the end of the colonial period. The percentage of national income for the village economy increased from 44% during Mughal times to 54% by the end of colonial period. India's per capita GDP decreased from 1990 Int'l$550 in 1700 to $520 by 1857, although it later increased to $618, by 1947.

Economic impact of the Raj

Historians continue to debate whether the long-term intention of British rule was to accelerate the economic development of India, or to distort and delay it. In 1780, the conservative British politician Edmund Burke raised the issue of India's position: he vehemently attacked the East India Company, claiming that Warren Hastings and other top officials had ruined the Indian economy and society. Indian historian Rajat Kanta Ray (1998) continues this line of attack, saying the new economy brought by the British in the 18th century was a form of "plunder" and a catastrophe for the traditional economy of the Mughal Empire. Ray accuses the British of depleting the food and money stocks and of imposing high taxes that helped cause the terrible Bengal famine of 1770, which killed a third of the people of Bengal.

P. J. Marshall shows that recent scholarship has reinterpreted the view that the prosperity of the formerly benign Mughal rule gave way to poverty and anarchy. He argues the British takeover did not make any sharp break with the past, which largely delegated control to regional Mughal rulers and sustained a generally prosperous economy for the rest of the 18th century. Marshall notes the British went into partnership with Indian bankers and raised revenue through local tax administrators and kept the old Mughal rates of taxation.

The East India Company inherited an onerous taxation system that took one-third of the produce of Indian cultivators. Instead of the Indian nationalist account of the British as alien aggressors, seizing power by brute force and impoverishing all of India, Marshall presents the interpretation (supported by many scholars in India and the West) that the British were not in full control but instead were players in what was primarily an Indian play and in which their rise to power depended upon excellent co-operation with Indian elites. Marshall admits that much of his interpretation is still highly controversial among many historians.

Demography

The population of the territory that became the British Raj was 100million by 1600 and remained nearly stationary until the 19th century. The population of the Raj reached 255million according to the first census taken in 1881 of India.

Studies of India's population since 1881 have focused on such topics as total population, birth and death rates, growth rates, geographic distribution, literacy, the rural and urban divide, cities of amillion, and the three cities with populations over eightmillion: Delhi, Greater Bombay, and Calcutta.

Mortality rates fell in the 1920–1945 era, primarily due to biological immunisation. Other factors included rising incomes and better living conditions, improved nutrition, a safer and cleaner environment, and better official health policies and medical care.

Severe overcrowding in the cities caused major public health problems, as noted in an official report from 1938:

 In the urban and industrial areas ... cramped sites, the high values of land and the necessity for the worker to live in the vicinity of his work ... all tend to intensify congestion and overcrowding. In the busiest centres houses are built close together, eave touching eave, and frequently back to back .... Space is so valuable that, in place of streets and roads, winding lanes provide the only approach to the houses. Neglect of sanitation is often evidenced by heaps of rotting garbage and pools of sewage, whilst the absence of latrines enhance the general pollution of air and soil.

Religion 
{| class="wikitable sortable"
|+ Religion in British India
|-
! Religion
! Population (1891) ! Percentage (1891) 
! Population (1921)
! Percentage (1921)
|-
| Hinduism
| 207,731,727
| 
| 216,734,586
|
|-
| Islam
| 57,321,164
|  
| 68,735,233
|
|-
| Tribal
| 9,280,467
| 
| 9,774,611
| 
|-
| Buddhism
| 7,131,361
| 
| 11,571,268
|
|-
| Christianity
| 2,284,380
| 
| 4,754,064
|
|-
| Sikhism
| 1,907,833
| 
| 3,238,803
|
|-
| Jainism
| 1,416,638
| 
| 1,178,596
|
|-
| Zoroastrianism
| 89,904
| 
| 101,778
|
|-
| Judaism
| 17,194
| 
| 21,778
|
|-
| Others
| 42,763
| 
| 18,004
|
|-
| Total Population
| 287,223,431
|
| 316,128,721
| 
|}

 Famines, epidemics, and public health 

During the British Raj, India experienced some of the worst famines ever recorded, including the Great Famine of 1876–1878, in which 6.1 million to 10.39 million Indians perished and the Indian famine of 1899–1900, in which 1.25 to 10 million Indians perished. Recent research, including work by Mike Davis and Amartya Sen, argue that famines in India were made more severe by British policies in India.

The first cholera pandemic began in Bengal, then spread across India by 1820. Tenthousand British troops and countless Indians died during this pandemic. Estimated deaths in India between 1817 and 1860 exceeded 15 million. Another 23 million died between 1865 and 1917. The Third plague pandemic which started in China in the middle of the 19th century, eventually spread to all inhabited continents and killed 10 million Indians in India alone. Waldemar Haffkine, who mainly worked in India, became the first microbiologist to develop and deploy vaccines against cholera and bubonic plague. In 1925 the Plague Laboratory in Bombay was renamed the Haffkine Institute.

Fevers ranked as one of the leading causes of death in India in the 19th century. Britain's Sir Ronald Ross, working in the Presidency General Hospital in Calcutta, finally proved in 1898 that mosquitoes transmit malaria, while on assignment in the Deccan at Secunderabad, where the Centre for Tropical and Communicable Diseases is now named in his honour.

In 1881 there were around 120,000 leprosy patients. The central government passed the Lepers Act of 1898, which provided legal provision for forcible confinement of people with leprosy in India. Under the direction of Mountstuart Elphinstone a program was launched to propagate smallpox vaccination. Mass vaccination in India resulted in a major decline in smallpox mortality by the end of the 19th century. In 1849 nearly 13% of all Calcutta deaths were due to smallpox. Between 1868 and 1907, there were approximately 4.7 million deaths from smallpox.

Sir Robert Grant directed his attention to establishing a systematic institution in Bombay for imparting medical knowledge to the natives. In 1860, Grant Medical College became one of the four recognised colleges for teaching courses leading to degrees (alongside Elphinstone College, Deccan College and Government Law College, Mumbai).

Education

Thomas Babington Macaulay (1800–1859) presented his Whiggish interpretation of English history as an upward progression always leading to more liberty and more progress. Macaulay simultaneously was a leading reformer involved in transforming the educational system of India. He would base it on the English language so that India could join the mother country in a steady upward progress. Macaulay took Burke's emphasis on moral rule and implemented it in actual school reforms, giving the British Empire a profound moral mission to "civilise the natives".

Yale professor Karuna Mantena has argued that the civilising mission did not last long, for she says that benevolent reformers were the losers in key debates, such as those following the 1857 rebellion in India, and the scandal of Edward Eyre's brutal repression of the Morant Bay rebellion in Jamaica in 1865. The rhetoric continued but it became an alibi for British misrule and racism. No longer was it believed that the natives could truly make progress, instead, they had to be ruled by heavy hand, with democratic opportunities postponed indefinitely. As a result:

English historian Peter Cain, has challenged Mantena, arguing that the imperialists truly believed that British rule would bring to the subjects the benefits of 'ordered liberty', thereby Britain could fulfil its moral duty and achieve its own greatness. Much of the debate took place in Britain itself, and the imperialists worked hard to convince the general population that the civilising mission was well under-way. This campaign served to strengthen imperial support at home, and thus, says Cain, to bolster the moral authority of the gentlemanly elites who ran the Empire.

Universities in Calcutta, Bombay, and Madras were established in 1857, just before the Rebellion. By 1890 some 60,000 Indians had matriculated, chiefly in the liberal arts or law. About a third entered public administration, and another third became lawyers. The result was a very well educated professional state bureaucracy. By 1887 of 21,000 mid-level civil services appointments, 45% were held by Hindus, 7% by Muslims, 19% by Eurasians (European father and Indian mother), and 29% by Europeans. Of the 1000 top-level civil services positions, almost all were held by Britons, typically with an Oxbridge degree. The government, often working with local philanthropists, opened 186universities and colleges of higher education by 1911; they enrolled 36,000 students (over 90% men). By 1939 the number of institutions had doubled and enrolment reached 145,000. The curriculum followed classical British standards of the sort set by Oxford and Cambridge and stressed English literature and European history. Nevertheless, by the 1920s the student bodies had become hotbeds of Indian nationalism.

Missionary work

In 1889, the prime minister of the United Kingdom, Robert Gascoyne-Cecil, 3rd Marquess of Salisbury stated, "It is not only our duty but is in our interest to promote the diffusion of Christianity as far as possible throughout the length and breadth of India."

The growth of the British Indian Army led to the arrival of many Anglican chaplains in India. Following the arrival of the Church of England's Church Mission Society in 1814, the Diocese of Calcutta of the Church of India, Burma and Ceylon (CIBC) was erected, with its St. Paul's Cathedral being built in 1847. By 1930, the Church of India, Burma and Ceylon had fourteen dioceses across the Indian Empire.

Missionaries from other Christian denominations came to British India as well; Lutheran missionaries, for example, arrived in Calcutta in 1836 and by "the year 1880 there were over 31,200 Lutheran Christians spread out in 1,052 villages". Methodists began arriving in India in 1783 and established missions with a focus on "education, health ministry, and evangelism". In the 1790s, Christians from the London Missionary Society and Baptist Missionary Society, began doing missionary work in the Indian Empire. In Neyoor, the London Missionary Society Hospital "pioneered improvements in the public health system for the treatment of diseases even before organised attempts were made by the colonial Madras Presidency, reducing the death rate substantially".

Christ Church College (1866) and St. Stephen's College (1881) are two examples of prominent church-affiliated educational institutions founded during the British Raj. Within educational institutions established during the British Raj, Christian texts, especially the Bible, were a part of the curricula. During the British Raj, Christian missionaries developed writing systems for Indian languages that previously did not have one. Christian missionaries in India also worked to increase literacy and also engaged in social activism, such as fighting against prostitution, championing the right of widowed women to remarry, and trying to stop early marriages for women. Among British women, zenana missions became a popular method to win converts to Christianity.

Legacy
The old consensus among historians held that British imperial authority was quite secure from 1858 to World War II. Recently, however, this interpretation has been challenged. For example, Mark Condos and Jon Wilson argue that imperial authority was chronically insecure. Indeed, the anxiety of generations of officials produced a chaotic administration with minimal coherence. Instead of a confident state capable of acting as it chose, these historians find a psychologically embattled one incapable of acting except in the abstract, small scale, or short term. Meanwhile, Durba Ghosh offers an alternative approach.

Ideological impact

At independence and after the independence of India, the country has maintained such central British institutions as parliamentary government, one-person, one-vote and the rule of law through nonpartisan courts. It retained as well the institutional arrangements of the Raj such as the civil services, administration of sub-divisions, universities and stock exchanges. One major change was the rejection of its former separate princely states. Metcalf shows that over the course of two centuries, British intellectuals and Indian specialists made the highest priority bringing peace, unity and good government to India. They offered many competing methods to reach the goal. For example, Cornwallis recommended turning Bengali Zamindar into the sort of English landlords that controlled local affairs in England. Munro proposed to deal directly with the peasants. Sir William Jones and the Orientalists promoted Sanskrit, while Macaulay promoted the English language. Zinkin argues that in the long-run, what matters most about the legacy of the Raj is the British political ideologies which the Indians took over after 1947, especially the belief in unity, democracy, the rule of law and a certain equality beyond caste and creed. Zinkin sees this not just in the Congress party but also among Hindu nationalists in the Bharatiya Janata Party, which specifically emphasises Hindu traditions.Y. K. Malik and V. B. Singh, Hindu Nationalists in India: the rise of the Bharatiya Janata Party (Westview Press, 1994), p. 14

 Cultural impact 
The British colonisation of India influenced Indian culture noticeably. The most noticeable influence is the English language which emerged as the administrative and lingua franca of India and Pakistan followed by the blend of native and gothic/sarcenic architecture. Similarly, the influence of the languages of India and culture can be seen on Britain, too; for example, many Indian words entering the English language, and also the adoption of Indian cuisine.

British sports (particularly hockey early on, but then largely replaced by cricket in recent decades, with football also popular in certain regions of the subcontinent) were cemented as part of South Asian culture during the British Raj, with the traditional games of India largely having been diminished in the process. During the Raj, soldiers would play British sports as a way of maintaining fitness, since the mortality rate for foreigners in India was high at the time, as well as in order to maintain a sense of Britishness; in the words of an anonymous writer, playing British sports was a way for soldiers to "defend themselves from the magic of the land". Though the British had generally excluded Indians from their play during the time of Company rule, over time they began to see the inculcation of British sports among the native populace as a way of spreading British values. At the same time, some of the Indian elite began to move towards British sports as a way of adapting to British culture and thus helping themselves to rise up the ranks; later on, more Indians began to play British sports in an effort to beat the British at their own sports, as a way of proving that the Indians were equal to their colonisers.

See also

 Colonial India
 Direct colonial rule
 Glossary of the British Raj (Hindi-Urdu words)
 Historiography of the British Empire
 Legislatures of British India
 List of governors-general of India
 Subsidiary alliance, the status of princely states

Notes

References

Bibliography

Surveys

 Allan, J., T. Wolseley Haig, H. H. Dodwell. The Cambridge Shorter History of India (1934) 996 pp.
 Bandhu, Deep Chand. History of Indian National Congress (2003) 405pp
 .
 .
 
 .
 
 
 
 Coupland, Reginald. India: A Re-Statement (Oxford University Press, 1945)
 Dodwell H. H., ed. The Cambridge History of India. Volume 6: The Indian Empire 1858–1918. With Chapters on the Development of Administration 1818–1858 (1932) 660 pp. online edition; also published as vol 5 of the Cambridge History of the British Empire Gilmour, David. The British in India: A Social History of the Raj(2018); expanded edition of The Ruling Caste: Imperial Lives in the Victorian Raj (2007) Excerpt and text search
 Herbertson, A.J. and O.J.R. Howarth. eds. The Oxford Survey Of The British Empire (6 vol 1914) online vol 2 on Asia pp. 1–328 on India
 James, Lawrence. Raj: The Making and Unmaking of British India (2000)
 .
 Louis, William Roger, and Judith M. Brown, eds. The Oxford History of the British Empire (5 vol 1999–2001), with numerous articles on the Raj
 
 
 
 Majumdar, R. C. ed. (1970). British paramountcy and Indian renaissance. (The history and culture of the Indian people) Bombay: Bharatiya Vidya Bhavan.
 Mansingh, Surjit The A to Z of India (2010), a concise historical encyclopaedia
 .
 
 
 Moon, Penderel. The British Conquest and Dominion of India (2 vol. 1989) 1235pp; the fullest scholarly history of political and military events from a British top-down perspective;
 
 Panikkar, K. M. (1953). Asia and Western dominance, 1498–1945, by K.M. Panikkar. London: G. Allen and Unwin.
 .
 Riddick, John F. The history of British India: a chronology (2006) excerpt and text search, covers 1599–1947
 Riddick, John F. Who Was Who in British India (1998), covers 1599–1947
 
 
 Smith, Vincent A. (1958) The Oxford History of India (3rd ed.) the Raj section was written by Percival Spear
 Somervell, D.C. The Reign of King George V, (1936) covers Raj 1910–35 pp. 80–84, 282–91, 455–64 online free
 .
 .
 .
 Thompson, Edward, and G.T. Garratt. Rise and Fulfilment of British Rule in India (1934) 690 pages; scholarly survey, 1599–1933 excerpt and text search
 .
 Wolpert, Stanley, ed. Encyclopedia of India (4 vol. 2005) comprehensive coverage by scholars
 

Specialised topics

 
 
 
 
 Bayly, Christopher Alan. Imperial Meridian: The British Empire and the World 1780-1830. (Routledge, 2016).
 
 Bosma, Ulbe (2011), Emigration: Colonial circuits between Europe and Asia in the 19th and early 20th century, EGO – European History Online, Mainz: Institute of European History, retrieved: March 25, 2021 (pdf).
 Brown, Judith M. Gandhi: Prisoner of Hope (1991), scholarly biography
 
 Buckland, C.E. Dictionary of Indian Biography (1906) 495 pp. full text
 
 .
 .
 .
 
 
 Dewey, Clive. Anglo-Indian Attitudes: The Mind of the Indian Civil Service (2003)
 Ewing, Ann. "Administering India: The Indian Civil Service", History Today, June 1982, 32#6 pp. 43–48, covers 1858–1947
 
 Gilmartin, David. 1988. Empire and Islam: Punjab and the Making of Pakistan. University of California Press. 258 pages. .
 Gilmour, David. Curzon: Imperial Statesman (2006) excerpt and text search
 Gopal, Sarvepalli. British Policy in India 1858–1905 (2008)
 
 Gopal, Sarvepalli. Viceroyalty of Lord Irwin 1926–1931 (1957)
 
 .
 
 
 
 
 
 
 .
 Kaminsky, Arnold P. The India Office, 1880–1910 (1986) excerpt and text search, focus on officials in London
 
 Khan, Yasmin. India At War: The Subcontinent and the Second World War (2015), wide-ranging scholarly survey excerpt; also published as Khan, Yasmin. The Raj At War: A People's History Of India's Second World War (2015) a major, comprehensive scholarly study
 
 
 Kumar, Deepak. Science and the Raj: A Study of British India (2006)
 Lipsett, Chaldwell. Lord Curzon in India 1898–1903 (1903) excerpt and text search 128pp
 .
 MacMillan, Margaret. Women of the Raj: The Mothers, Wives, and Daughters of the British Empire in India (2007)
 
 
 
 Moore, Robin J. "India in the 1940s", in Robin Winks, ed. Oxford History of the British Empire: Historiography, (2001b), pp. 231–42
 
 
 Raghavan, Srinath. India's War: World War II and the Making of Modern South Asia (2016). wide-ranging scholarly survey excerpt
 
 
 
 Read, Anthony, and David Fisher; The Proudest Day: India's Long Road to Independence (W. W. Norton, 1999) Archive.org, borrowable
 Riddick, John F. The History of British India: A Chronology (2006) excerpt
 Riddick, John F. Who Was Who in British India (1998); 5000 entries excerpt
 .
 .
 Thatcher, Mary. Respected Memsahibs: an Anthology (Hardinge Simpole, 2008)
 .
 Voigt, Johannes. India in The Second World War (1988)
 .
 .
 Wolpert, Stanley A. Jinnah of Pakistan (2005)
 Wolpert, Stanley A. Tilak and Gokhale: revolution and reform in the making of modern India (1962) full text online

Economic and social history

 Anstey, Vera. The economic development of India (4th ed. 1952), 677pp; thorough scholarly coverage; focus on 20th century down to 1939
 Ballhatchet, Kenneth. Race, Sex, and Class under the Raj: Imperial Attitudes and Policies and Their Critics, 1793–1905 (1980).
 Chaudhary, Latika, et al. eds. A New Economic History of Colonial India (2015)
 
 Chaudhuri, Nupur. "Imperialism and Gender." in Encyclopedia of European Social History, edited by Peter N. Stearns, (vol. 1, 2001), pp. 515–521. online emphasis on Raj.
 Dutt, Romesh C. The Economic History of India under early British Rule (1901); The Economic History of India in the Victorian Age (1906) online
 Gupta, Charu, ed. Gendering Colonial India: Reforms, Print, Caste and Communalism (2012)
 Hyam, Ronald. Empire and Sexuality: The British Experience (1990).
 
 Lockwood, David. The Indian Bourgeoisie: A Political History of the Indian Capitalist Class in the Early Twentieth Century (I.B. Tauris, 2012) 315 pages; focus on Indian entrepreneurs who benefited from the Raj, but ultimately sided with the Indian National Congress.
 
 
 Sarkar, J. (2013, reprint). Economics of British India ... Third edition. Enlarged and partly rewritten. Calcutta: M.C. Sarkar & Sons.
 
 Sinha, Mrinalini. Colonial Masculinity: The 'Manly Englishman' and the 'Effeminate Bengali' in the Late Nineteenth Century (1995).
 Strobel, Margaret. European Women and the Second British Empire (1991).
 
 
 

Historiography and memory
 
 Durant, Will (2011, reprint). The case for India. New York: Simon and Schuster.
 
 
 
 Mantena, Rama Sundari. The Origins of Modern Historiography in India: Antiquarianism and Philology (2012)
 Moor-Gilbert, Bart. Writing India, 1757–1990: The Literature of British India (1996) on fiction written in English
 Mukherjee, Soumyen. "Origins of Indian Nationalism: Some Questions on the Historiography of Modern India." Sydney Studies in Society and Culture 13 (2014). online
 Nawaz, Rafida, and Syed Hussain Murtaza. "Impact of Imperial Discourses on Changing Subjectivities in Core and Periphery: A Study of British India and British Nigeria." Perennial Journal of History 2.2 (2021): 114–130. online
 Nayak, Bhabani Shankar. "Colonial world of postcolonial historians: reification, theoreticism, and the neoliberal reinvention of tribal identity in India." Journal of Asian and African Studies 56.3 (2021): 511–532 online.
 Parkash, Jai. "Major trends of historiography of revolutionary movement in India – Phase II." (PhD dissertation, Maharshi Dayanand University, 2013). online
 Philips, Cyril H. ed. Historians of India, Pakistan and Ceylon (1961), reviews the older scholarship
 
 Stern, Philip J. "Early Eighteenth-Century British India: Antimeridian or antemeridiem?." '''Journal of Colonialism and Colonial History 21.2 (2020) pp 1–26, focus on C.A. Bayly, Imperial Meridian online.
 
 Winks, Robin, ed. Historiography (1999) vol. 5 in William Roger Louis, eds. The Oxford History of the British Empire
 Winks, Robin W. The Historiography of the British Empire-Commonwealth: Trends, Interpretations and Resources (1966)
 Young, Richard Fox, ed. (2009). Indian Christian Historiography from Below, from Above, and in Between India and the Indianness of Christianity: Essays on Understanding – Historical, Theological, and Bibliographical – in Honor of Robert Eric Frykenberg

Further reading

 Judd, Denis. The lion and the tiger: the rise and fall of the British Raj, 1600-1947 (Oxford University Press, 2005).  online

 Malone, David M., C. Raja Mohan, and Srinath Raghavan, eds. The Oxford handbook of Indian foreign policy (2015) excerpt pp 55–79.
 Simon Report (1930) vol 1, wide-ranging survey of conditions
 Editors, Charles Rivers (2016). The British Raj: The History and Legacy of Great Britain's Imperialism in India and the Indian subcontinent.
 , major primary source

Year books and statistical records
 Indian Year-book for 1862: A review of social, intellectual, and religious progress in India and Ceylon (1863), ed. by John Murdoch online edition 1861 edition
 
 The Imperial Gazetteer of India (26 vol, 1908–31), highly detailed description of all of India in 1901. online edition
 Statistical abstract relating to British India, from 1895–96 to 1904–05 (London, 1906) full text online,
 The Cyclopedia of India: biographical, historical, administrative, commercial (1908) business history, biographies, illustrations
 The Indian Year Book: 1914 (1914)
 The Indian Annual Register: A digest of public affairs of India regarding the nation's activities in the matters, political, economic, industrial, educational, etc. during the period 1919–1947 online
 1930 edition
 1921 edition
 1919–1947 editions

British India
 
 
Bangladesh and the Commonwealth of Nations
Raj
India and the Commonwealth of Nations
Pakistan and the Commonwealth of Nations
States and territories disestablished in 1947
States and territories established in 1858